Akyem Bosome describes a traditional geo political entity. A state with a non contiguous land mass that exists today in the Eastern and Ashanti region of Ghana.

The capital of the present date nation state of Akyem Bosome is Akyem Swedru.

It was founded in 1831 through a purchase of land by Bosompem Ntow II from the family of Barim Atwere of Aduasa.

After the acquisition of the land by Bosompem Ntow II, the Bosome people then migrated from the area around present day lake Bosomtwi to take possession of the land.

List of rulers of the Akan state of Akyem Bosume

See also 
Akan people
Ghana
Gold Coast
Lists of incumbents

Government of Ghana
Rulers
Lists of African rulers